This is a list of members of the Victorian Legislative Assembly from 1999 to 2002, as elected at the 1999 state election:

 The incumbent member for Frankston East, Liberal-turned-independent Peter McLellan, died on the morning of 18 September 1999, the day of the 1999 election. As a result, voting in the seat was discontinued later in the day, with the result instead to be decided in a by-election. The resulting by-election was won by Labor candidate Matt Viney on 16 October 1999.
 On 3 November 1999, the Liberal member for Burwood and former Premier of Victoria, Jeff Kennett, resigned. Labor candidate Bob Stensholt won the resulting by-election on 11 December 1999.
 On 16 December 1999, the National member for Benalla and former Deputy Premier of Victoria, Pat McNamara, resigned. Labor candidate Denise Allen won the resulting by-election on 13 May 2000.

Members of the Parliament of Victoria by term
21st-century Australian politicians
20th-century Australian politicians